Yog Japee is an Indian actor who has appeared in character roles. He made his breakthrough playing the supporting role of Ranjith in Billa (2007), before playing a role of a police officer in Soodhu Kavvum (2013) and a negative role in Abrahaminte Santhathikal (2018). He has also acted in a few Telugu and Malayalam films.

Career 
He has worked often in Gautham Vasudev Menon's police films, and as Ranjith in the Billa film series. He also won positive reviews for his work in Soodhu Kavvum. He made his first appearance in a Malayalam film in 7th Day (2014).

Japee is the founder of Chennai-based theatre company Theatre Y, and has worked various colleges and schools in India and with international clients such as the British Council and the United Nations His work focuses on theatre training with children and mainstreaming theatre into education, as a tool for social awareness and development. Theatre Y strives towards a larger intervention of arts and culture in the education curriculum. Japee is a recipient of the international Fellowship on the Chevening-Clore Leadership Programme for Cultural Leaders for 2012–13, one among four scholars selected worldwide for this scholarship.

Filmography

References

External links

Living people
21st-century Indian male actors
Male actors in Tamil cinema
Year of birth missing (living people)
Tamil male actors
Male actors in Malayalam cinema
Male actors in Telugu cinema
Indian male film actors